John Scully may refer to:
 John Scully (Jesuit) (1844–1917), American Roman Catholic priest and president of Fordham University
 John Scully (American football) (born 1958), former American college and professional football player 
 John Scully (journalist) (born 1941), Canadian author, producer and journalist
 Iceman John Scully (born 1967), American boxer
 John Sculley (born 1939), former Apple CEO